Audubon, the National Audubon Society, is an American environmental organization.

Audubon may also refer to:

People
 John James Audubon (1785–1851), French-American ornithologist, naturalist, and painter
 Lucy Bakewell Audubon (1787–1874), educator and philanthropist, wife of John James Audubon

Places in the United States
 Audubon, Georgia, an unincorporated community
 Audubon, Iowa, city
 Audubon, Louisville, Kentucky, neighborhood 
 Audubon, New Orleans, Louisiana, neighborhood 
 Audubon, Minnesota, city
 Audubon, New Jersey, borough 
 Audubon, Pennsylvania, census-designated place
 Audubon Canyon, California
 Audubon County, Iowa
 Audubon Township, Montgomery County, Illinois

Nature organizations 
 Audubon International, environmental management practices education organization based in New York
 Audubon Nature Institute, New Orleans, Louisiana, including:
 Audubon Butterfly Garden and Insectarium
 Audubon Zoo
 Massachusetts Audubon Society
 Trinity River Audubon Center, Dallas, Texas
 Audubon Park (disambiguation)

Other 
 75564 Audubon, an asteroid
 Audubon Avenue, Manhattan, New York City
 Audubon (book), a biography of John James Audubon
 Audubon (film), a 2017 documentary about John James Audubon
 Audubon (magazine), published by the National Audubon Society
 Audubon State Historic Site, Louisiana
 Audubon (Scott County, Kentucky), house
 Audubon Parkway, Kentucky
 Audubon Quartet, former string quartet

See also 
 Autobahn (disambiguation)